Eduard Eelma (7 April 1902 – 16 November 1941) until 1937 Eduard-Vilhelm Ellmann, was an Estonian footballer — one of the most famous before World War II. He played 59 times for Estonia national football team scoring 21 goals. He debuted on 23 July 1921, against Sweden. He participated in Summer Olympics in Paris 1924. He spent most of his playing career at Tallinna JK. Eduard Eelma's international career lasted from 1921 to 1935 and his goalscoring record of 21 international goals was only beaten in 2002, by Indrek Zelinski and later by Andres Oper.

Eduard Eelma was arrested by NKVD in Tallinn in summer 1941, sentenced to death and executed in Prison No. 1 in Kirov on 16 November 1941.

Statistics

International

Honours

Club
Kalev
Estonian champion: 1923

Tallinna
Estonian champion: 1926, 1928

Estonia Tallinn
Estonian champion: 1934, 1935

International
Estonia
Baltic Cup: 1929, 1931

External links 
 History of Eduard Ellman-Eelma on rsssf.com

References 

1902 births
1941 deaths
Footballers from Saint Petersburg
Estonian footballers
Estonia international footballers
Nonpersons in the Eastern Bloc
Estonian people executed by the Soviet Union
Footballers at the 1924 Summer Olympics
Olympic footballers of Estonia
JK Tallinna Kalev players
Association football forwards